Lalka Stoyanova Berberova (11 June 1965 – 24 July 2006) was a Bulgarian rower. She was born in Plovdiv.

References

External links
 
 

1965 births
2006 deaths
Bulgarian female rowers
Sportspeople from Plovdiv
Rowers at the 1988 Summer Olympics
Rowers at the 1992 Summer Olympics
Olympic silver medalists for Bulgaria
Olympic rowers of Bulgaria
Olympic medalists in rowing
Medalists at the 1988 Summer Olympics